Mozzarella sticks are elongated pieces of battered or breaded mozzarella, usually served as hors d'oeuvre.

Origins

The history of frying cheese in a batter dates back to at least 1393 in Medieval France, when a recipe for fried cheese sticks appeared in Le Ménagier de Paris. However, food historians believe that Medieval French fried cheeses had little in common with the preparation and development of modern mozzarella sticks.

Mozzarella sticks likely have their origins in the United States during the 1970s, through a combination of two factors, as per historian Joel Jensen: "the increasing availability of mass-produced mozzarella cheese beginning in the 1960s", and the development of new efficient frying technologies to be used in fast-paced food-serving businesses (such as bowling alleys and sports bars).

Preparation 
Mozzarella sticks are prepared by coating cheese strings in breadcrumbs or batter. They may be baked or fried in oil. Mozzarella sticks are often served with tomato sauce or marinara sauce. However, they may be served with other dipping sauces such as plum sauce, jalapeño jelly, ketchup, barbecue sauce, honey mustard sauce, and ranch dressing. Restaurants often serve fried mozzarella sticks with a marinara sauce.

Variations 
Popular fried cheeses other than mozzarella include provolone, Edam, cheddar, and American. Mozzarella sticks with raspberry sauce are part of the regional cuisine of New York's Capital District.

References

French cuisine
American cuisine
Appetizers
Cheese dishes
Deep fried foods
Italian-American cuisine
Fast food